is a train station on the Tōkaidō Line in Tsukamoto Nichome, Yodogawa-ku, Osaka, Osaka Prefecture, Japan.

Line
West Japan Railway Company (JR West)
Tōkaidō Line (JR Kobe Line, JR Takarazuka Line)

Facilities

This station has two elevated island platforms with four tracks. Tracks 1 and 4 are fenced as all trains running on the outer tracks pass through this station without stopping.

This station is an intermediate station on the "JR Kobe Line". However, the only direction for Sannomiya and Takarazuka is informed as the "JR Kobe Line" and the opposite direction (for Osaka and Kyoto) as the "JR Kyoto Line".
Rapid services and some Fukuchiyama Line local trains originating and terminating at Osaka pass the following tracks of this station.
Outer tracks - special rapid services, JR Takarazuka Line rapid services, JR Kobe Line rapid services (in the morning), Fukuchiyama Line local trains originating and terminating at Osaka
Inner tracks - JR Kobe Line rapid services (except above)

Wye
A wye is located in the north of Tsukamoto Station, connecting to Miyahara Depot on the Hoppo Freight Line. The wye is treated as a part of the facilities of this station.

On the eastbound tracks, the first entering signal is located at the branch of the Hoppo Freight Line, the second is in the wye, the third is at the junction of the track from Miyahara, then the fourth is in the north of the platform for Osaka and Shin-Osaka. The departure signal is located in the south of the platform.

On the westbound tracks, the signal in the south of the platform for Amagasaki is not the entering signal but block signal 0. The entering signal is located in the north of the platform and the track branches off to Miyahara, then after passing several block signals in the wye, the departure signal is at the junction of the Hoppo Freight Line.

Adjacent stations

|-
!colspan=5|West Japan Railway Company (JR West)

History 
Station numbering was introduced in March 2018 with Tsukamoto being assigned station number JR-A48 for the JR Kobe Line and JR-G48 for the Fukuchiyama Line.

References 

Tōkaidō Main Line
JR Kobe Line
Railway stations in Osaka Prefecture
Railway stations in Japan opened in 1934